These Walls may refer to:
These Walls (Teddy Geiger song), 2006 Teddy Geiger song
These Walls (Dream Theater song), 2005 Dream Theater song
These Walls, 2002 Trapt song
These Walls (Kendrick Lamar song), 2015 Kendrick Lamar song